Martha Jane Rountree (October 23, 1911 – August 23, 1999) was an American pioneering broadcast journalist and entrepreneur. She was the creator and first moderator of a public-affairs program, first on radio as The American Mercury from June 24, 1945 to 1947, and as Meet the Press on the NBC television network from November 6, 1947 to November 1, 1953. She is the only female moderator in the seven-decade history of the show.

Early years
Born in Gainesville, Florida, Martha Jane Rountree was raised in Columbia, S.C. Her father Earl was in sales, at times in real estate, and at other times, selling automobiles, but he was not successful. He died when Martha was 16, and as she later told a reporter, "he left us with absolutely nothing." In order to pay her way through the University of South Carolina, she worked for the Columbia Record newspaper. Unable to finish her university education for financial reasons, she used her interest in journalism to find work, taking a job as a reporter with The Tampa Tribune in Tampa, Florida.

Early years in New York 
In 1938, she moved to New York City from Tampa and worked as a freelance writer. In 1944, she and her sister Ann founded a production company, Radio House, which prepared singing commercials and transcribed programs. One of their ideas was produced by the Mutual Broadcasting System in 1945; it was Leave It to the Girls, which had a panel of one man asking women celebrities questions that had been sent in by viewers. In 1946, eleven years after Lawrence E. Spivak purchased the magazine The American Mercury, she sent in an unsolicited article which was published. From 1947 to 1954, she worked as a roving editor for the periodical. Because of her experience in radio, Spivak asked for her critique of a radio show he used to promote The American Mercury.

Launching of Meet the Press
Based on her strong criticism of Spivak's self-promoting program, Rountree created a new radio show, which she called The American Mercury Presents:  Meet the Press, debuting on June 24, 1945. On November 6, 1947, while still on Mutual radio, it was subsequently reincarnated on the NBC television network and renamed Meet the Press. Contrary to the claims of others concerning the program's creator, Rountree developed the idea on her own, and Spivak joined as co-producer and business partner in the enterprise after the show had already debuted.

The program's innovative idea was to have public figures respond to probing questions without prior preparation and for those being interviewed to be held accountable on issues of the day.

After Meet the Press
While still moderating Meet the Press, Rountree also hosted Keep Posted, a discussion program for the DuMont TV network (renamed The Big Issue after The Saturday Evening Post withdrew its sponsorship) from 1951 through 1954. In 1953, she sold her shares of Meet the Press and The Big Issue to Spivak for $125,000, reportedly after a coin-toss, and left her job at Meet the Press. 

Rountree started the magazine Know the Facts in 1955. In the same year, she established the radio station WKTF in Northern Virginia.

She returned to television in the summer of 1956 as the moderator of Press Conference (later retitled Martha Rountree’s Press Conference), which was similar in format to Meet the Press. In the 60s, she served as Washington correspondent for New York's WOR radio and other stations.

In 1965, Rountree founded the Leadership Foundation, a conservative, non-profit, public-affairs organization in Washington, D.C. She was a member of the National Press Club (founded 1908) and the Women's National Press Club (founded 1919).

Her first marriage was to Albert N. Williams, Jr. in 1941. The marriage lasted seven years and ended in divorce in 1948.  In 1952, she married Oliver M. Presbrey, an advertising-agency executive. He died in 1988. 

She covered national conventions in the 1950s and 1960s, appeared as a guest on the Phil Donahue television talk show, led a national campaign in support of school prayer and testified before the 1988 Republican National Convention's Platform Committee. A popular Washington hostess, she included many cabinet members, members of Congress and their wives among her friends.

Rountree founded Leadership Foundation, a 501(c)3 entity (educational), and Leadership Action, a 501(c)4 entity (lobbying), located on MacArthur Boulevard, in Cabin John, MD - near her home on Comanche Court in Bethesda, Maryland, in the suburbs of Washington, DC where she lived with Presbrey.

The board of directors and advisory board of Leadership Foundation included some of the leading political figures of her era.

The foundation published the Leadership Action Alert political newsletter which was mailed on a regular basis to its thousands of members across the country. It also served as the umbrella foundation for special projects, such as the National Center for Pan-American Studies (NCPAS), a group chaired by Joseph Quinn, which created a political youth leadership exchange program between students in Latin America and the United States.  The NCPAS was a member group of the IYY Commission (International Youth Year, a UN sponsored program) as well as a participant in the White House Working Group on Central America. Rountree's relationship with the Reagan White House was a close one.

In her later years, Rountree's vision had grown quite feeble but she never let on. Only her closest friends were aware that her many years in the bright klieg lights of television had taken its toll on her own physical vision (by the mid-1980s she was practically blind), but still her sense of patriotism and heart-felt "vision" of a greater America remained very strong. Her activities with Leadership Foundation served as the final chapter in her long life. In the end of her life, though, her many beautiful memories of famous people and world changing events, were slowly taken away from her.

Rountree won a Peabody Award for her role as co-founder and producer of Meet the Press.

Rountree died in Washington, DC, from complications of Alzheimer's disease aged 87.

Assessments
"I think of Martha as one of the most creative women I’ve ever known,” opined Liz Carpenter, the former White House staff director and press secretary of Lady Bird Johnson. “She won a wide audience by initiating a thoughtful debate of issues on the air before it became commonplace.”

Mrs. William Randolph Hearst described Rountree as “a diesel engine under a lace handkerchief.”

References

Notes
Ware, Susan & Stacey Lorraine Braukman. 2004. Notable American Women:A Biographical Dictionary Completing the 20th Century, Harvard University Press.

External links
 Meet the Press (May 17, 1953):  Martha Rountree with James Wechsler, Marquis Childs, Frank Waldrop, Bert Andrews, and Lawrence Spivak].
Meet the Press - About
The Nation - "Meet The Press and Leave it to the Girls"
Paley Center for Media She Made It - Martha Rountree
Files, John.  The New York Times obituary August 25, 1999
1951 Time magazine review of Meet the Press

The Definitive: Meet The Press radio program
Martha Rountree papers, at the University of Maryland libraries

1911 births
1999 deaths
People from Gainesville, Florida
American radio journalists
American television news anchors
NBC News people
Journalists from Florida
20th-century American journalists